The MIT School of Engineering (SoE) is one of the five schools of the Massachusetts Institute of Technology, located in Cambridge, Massachusetts, United States. SoE has eight academic departments and two interdisciplinary institutes. The School grants SB, MEng, SM, engineer's degrees, and PhD or ScD degrees. , the Dean of Engineering is Professor Anantha Chandrakasan. The school is the largest at MIT as measured by undergraduate and graduate enrollments and faculty members.

Departments and initiatives 

Departments:
 Aeronautics and Astronautics (Course 16)
 Biological Engineering (Course 20)
 Chemical Engineering (Course 10)
 Civil and Environmental Engineering (Course 1)
 Electrical Engineering and Computer Science (Course 6, joint department with MIT Schwarzman College of Computing)
 Materials Science and Engineering (Course 3)
 Mechanical Engineering (Course 2)
 Nuclear Science and Engineering (Course 22)

Institutes:
 Institute for Medical Engineering and Science
 Health Sciences and Technology program (joint MIT-Harvard, "HST" in the course catalog)

(Departments and degree programs are commonly referred to by course catalog numbers on campus.)

Laboratories and research centers 
 Abdul Latif Jameel Water and Food Systems Lab 
 Center for Advanced Nuclear Energy Systems
 Center for Computational Engineering
 Center for Materials Science and Engineering
 Center for Ocean Engineering
 Center for Transportation and Logistics
 Industrial Performance Center
 Institute for Soldier Nanotechnologies
 Koch Institute for Integrative Cancer Research
 Laboratory for Information and Decision Systems
 Laboratory for Manufacturing and Productivity
 Materials Processing Center
 Microsystems Technology Laboratories
 MIT Lincoln Laboratory Beaver Works Center
 Novartis-MIT Center for Continuous Manufacturing
 Ocean Engineering Design Laboratory
 Research Laboratory of Electronics
 SMART Center
 Sociotechnical Systems Research Center
 Tata Center for Technology and Design

2020 changes
The Computer Science and Artificial Intelligence Laboratory, Laboratory for Information and Decision Systems and Institute for Data, Systems and Society were moved to the MIT Schwarzman College of Computing upon its creation, and the Department of Electrical Engineering and Computer Science is now administered jointly.

Former MIT Deans of Engineering
Vannevar Bush 1931-1938
Edward Leyburn Moreland 1938-1946
Thomas Kilgore Sherwood 1946-1952
Edward Lull Cochrane 1952-1954
Carl Richard Söderberg 1954-1959
Gordon Stanley Brown 1959-1968
Raymond Lewis Bisplinghoff 1968-1971
Alfred H. Keil 1971-1977
James D. Bruce 1977-1978 (Acting Dean)
Robert Seamans 1978-1981
Gerald L. Wilson 1981-1991
Joel Moses 1991-1995
Robert A. Brown 1996-1999
Thomas L. Magnanti 1999-2007
Subra Suresh 2007-2009
Cynthia Barnhart 2009–2011 (Acting Dean)

References

External links
 MIT School of Engineering website
 MIT Learning International Networks Consortium
 School of Engineering Dean's Advisory Council (DAC)

Massachusetts Institute of Technology
Engineering schools and colleges in the United States
Engineering universities and colleges in Massachusetts
Universities and colleges in Cambridge, Massachusetts
University subdivisions in Massachusetts